The Van Rysselberghe House is a town house built by Octave van Rysselberghe in Ixelles, Brussels, Belgium. It was the personal house of Octave van Rysselberghe and is located at 83, /, a few steps from the Hôtel Otlet erected by the same architect.

The building, semi-detached, has a narrow facade which revolves around a protruding staircase in the form of tower. According to Pierre Loze, Dominique Vautier and Marina Vestre: "this stripped-down facade, almost devoid of any decoration, fits into the pre-rationalist current that was emerging at that time." 

Built in 1912, the Van Rysselberghe House was listed as a monument in 1997.

Gallery

References

External links
 

Houses in Belgium
Ixelles
Octave van Rysselberghe buildings
Houses completed in 1912